Yenikadılı is a village in the Boğazkale District of Çorum Province in Turkey. Its population is 26 (2022).

References

Villages in Boğazkale District